Kryptochroma is a genus of South American bark-dwelling crab spiders erected by M. Machado, R. Viecelli, and C. Guzati in 2021 after a phylogenetic analysis showed that Stephanopis contained two distinctly different clades. The genus was created for the "pentacantha" clade, as well as for several newly described species.

Species
 it contains nine species:
K. gigas Machado & Viecelli, 2021 – Brazil
K. hilaris Machado & Teixeira, 2021 – Brazil
K. macrostyla (Mello-Leitão, 1929) – Brazil
K. parahybana (Mello-Leitão, 1929) – French Guiana, Brazil
K. pentacantha (Mello-Leitão, 1929) (type) – Brazil
K. quadrata Machado & Viecelli, 2021 – Brazil
K. quinquetuberculata (Taczanowski, 1872) – Colombia, French Guiana, Brazil
K. renipalpis (Mello-Leitão, 1929) – Brazil
K. septata Machado & Teixeira, 2021 – Brazil

See also
 Stephanopis
 Thomisus
 List of Thomisidae genera

References

Further reading

Thomisidae genera
Spiders of South America